Mouth harp may refer to:

 Harmonica
 Jaw harp or Jew's harp
 morsing
 temir komuz